Ilya Trachynski (born 29 May 1989) is a Belarusian professional footballer who plays for Rogachev.

External links

1989 births
Living people
Belarusian footballers
Association football midfielders
Belarusian expatriate footballers
Expatriate footballers in Lithuania
FC Shakhtyor Soligorsk players
FC Volna Pinsk players
FC Vitebsk players
FC Isloch Minsk Raion players
FC Smolevichi players
FK Utenis Utena players
FK Šilas players
FC Slutsk players
FC Orsha players
FC Granit Mikashevichi players
FC Krumkachy Minsk players
FC Slonim-2017 players
FC Dnepr Rogachev players